Cheryl Ann Salisbury (born 8 March 1974) is a former association football player who represented Australia internationally as a defender from 1994 until 2009, winning 151 caps.

Biography
She most recently played as a defender for the New York Power in the WUSA and for the Newcastle United Jets in the W-League.  She went on to become coach of the Broadmeadow Magic team in the Northern NSW Herald Women's Premier League competition.

Salisbury was captain of the Australian female national team, the Matildas. She is Australia's 3rd highest female international goalscorer of all time with 38 goals in representative fixtures, behind Lisa De Vanna on 47 and Kate Gill 41. Salisbury became only the second Australian female to play 100 A-internationals, which she achieved during the 2004 Summer Olympics –  in the 1–1 draw against USA. In 1999, Salisbury and 12 teammates posed for a nude calendar photoshoot to raise money for the national women's football team.

On 27 January 2009, she announced she would retire after the game against Italy at Parramatta Stadium. The game finished as a 2–2 draw, with Salisbury scoring a penalty. The veteran of 151 international appearances received a standing ovation as she was substituted with six minutes remaining.

In 2009, Salisbury was inducted into the Australian Football Hall of Fame, in the Hall of Champions category.

In 2017, Salisbury was awarded the Alex Tobin Medal by the PFA.

In 2019, it was announced that she would become the first women's footballer to be inducted into Sport Australia Hall of Fame.

Honours

Country
Australia
 OFC Women's Nations Cup: 1994, 1998, 2003

References

External links
 
Cheryl Salisbury at Aussie Footballers
 Profile at Women's United Soccer Association

1974 births
Living people
Australian Institute of Sport soccer players
Australian women's soccer players
Footballers at the 2000 Summer Olympics
Footballers at the 2004 Summer Olympics
Olympic soccer players of Australia
1995 FIFA Women's World Cup players
1999 FIFA Women's World Cup players
2003 FIFA Women's World Cup players
2007 FIFA Women's World Cup players
Women's United Soccer Association players
New York Power players
Newcastle Jets FC (A-League Women) players
FIFA Century Club
USL W-League (1995–2015) players
Speranza Osaka-Takatsuki players
Nadeshiko League players
Australian expatriate women's soccer players
Australia women's international soccer players
Expatriate women's footballers in Japan
Expatriate women's soccer players in the United States
Bunnys Kyoto SC players
Australian expatriate sportspeople in the United States
Australian expatriate sportspeople in Japan
People educated at Newcastle Boys' High School
Sportspeople from Newcastle, New South Wales
Women's association football defenders
Sport Australia Hall of Fame inductees
Sportswomen from New South Wales
Soccer players from New South Wales